The Arabella-Hochhaus is a 23-storey, hotel/apartment building at Arabellapark, in the Bogenhausen neighborhood in eastern Munich, Germany

History
Until the 1990s, the former Musicland Studios was located in its basement. In order to meet demand for hotel rooms during the 1972 Olympic Games, the building was partly converted into the 467-room Arabella Bogenhausen Hotel, one of the largest hotels in Munich. In 1998, a joint venture was formed between Arabella Hotel Holding and Starwood and the hotel was renamed ArabellaSheraton Bogenhausen. It has since been renamed Sheraton Munich Arabellapark Hotel. The company operates the hotel jointly with The Westin Grand Munich, located across the street. In addition to the hotel, the building is at present home to two clinics, 550 rental apartments, and 100 offices and surgeries. The rooftop features a large spa area.

The building was set for demolition in 2026, as it is at the natural end of its lifespan, ineligible for landmark status, and unsuited to renovation due to its obsolete construction methods. However, the demolition has been postponed to 2030, due to the COVID-19 pandemic, and the hotel will remain open, downgraded to Marriott's Four Points by Sheraton brand in June 2022 as Four Points by Sheraton Munich Arabellapark.

Arabella-Hochhaus is also located in close vicinity to the headquarters of HypoVereinsbank (Hypo-Haus).

References

Buildings and structures in Munich
Buildings and structures completed in 1969
Hotel buildings completed in 1969
Hotels established in 1972
Hotels in Munich
Skyscraper hotels in Germany
Skyscrapers in Munich
Sheraton hotels